Gardner is an unincorporated community and census-designated place in Hardee County, Florida, United States. Its population was 364 as of the 2020 census.

Demographics

References

Unincorporated communities in Hardee County, Florida
Unincorporated communities in Florida
Census-designated places in Florida
Census-designated places in Hardee County, Florida